Józef Gosławski, also known as Iosif Vikentievich Goslavsky (1865 – 30 January 1904) was a Polish architect mainly active in Baku, Azerbaijan.

Life and contributions

Józef Gosławski was born near Warsaw in Congress Poland to a noble Polish family. In 1891, he graduated from the Institute of Civil Engineering in Saint Petersburg, and a year later he was appointed chief architect of the city of Baku (present-day capital of Azerbaijan). His first task was to assist the local architect Robert Marfeld in designing and supervising the construction of the largest church in the Caucasus, the Alexander Nevsky Cathedral of Baku.

The building of the grandiose cathedral was completed in 1898 with the help of Baku's Eastern Orthodox, Muslim and Jewish communities who provided funding in addition to the money provided by the government. Gosławski's other architectural contributions in Baku were the Taghiyev Residence (present-day Azerbaijan State Museum of History), the Empress Alexandra Russian Muslim Boarding School for Girls (present-day Fuzuli Institute of Manuscripts of the National Academy of Sciences of Azerbaijan), a number of industrial buildings and houses. Gosławski's final creation was the City Duma (present-day Baku City Hall), whose both exterior and interior was designed by him. The construction of the building, which even today remains one of the major sights in Baku, cost 400,000 golden roubles. However, Gosławski never lived to see the completion of the construction. He died in Baku at the age of 38 of tuberculosis, several months before the opening of the Duma. At the time of his death, Józef Gosławski was married and had three children. 

On 30 August 2006, President of Azerbaijan Ilham Aliyev signed an act, affirming the placing of commemorative plaque at Gosławski's house in Baku, at 31 Mirza Ibrahimov Street. On 11 June 2008, First Lady of Poland Maria Kaczyńska officially unveiled the plaque devoted to the Polish architect in Baku.

Gallery

See also
History of Baku

References

External links
 Works of Polish Architects in Baku by Prof. Shamil Fatullayev-Figarov
 Building of Mayoralty of Baku, designed by Gosławski, screened from a drone.

1865 births
1904 deaths
Saint-Petersburg State University of Architecture and Civil Engineering alumni
Architects from Warsaw
Polish engineers who worked in Azerbaijan

Architects from Baku

20th-century deaths from tuberculosis
Tuberculosis deaths in Azerbaijan